Axel Frederiksen   (1894–1951) was a Danish composer.

See also
List of Danish composers

References
This article was initially translated from the Danish Wikipedia.

Male composers
1894 births
1951 deaths
20th-century Danish composers
20th-century Danish male musicians